John La Rose (27 December 1927 – 28 February 2006) was a political and cultural activist, poet, writer, publisher, founder in 1966 of New Beacon Books, the first specialist Caribbean publishing company in Britain, and subsequently Chairman of the George Padmore Institute. He was originally from Trinidad and Tobago but was involved in the struggle for political independence and cultural and social change in the Caribbean in the 1940s and 1950s and later in Britain, the rest of Europe and the Third World.

Biography

Early life in the Caribbean: 1927–60
John Anthony La Rose was born in Arima, Trinidad and Tobago, in 1927, the younger son of Ferdinand La Rose, a cocoa trader, and his teacher wife Emily. He had four sisters and a brother. La Rose attended the local Roman Catholic school, and at the age of nine won a scholarship to St. Mary's College, Port of Spain. After finishing school he taught at St. Mary's and later became a leading insurance executive in Colonial Life, which was then in the process of becoming the biggest insurance company in the Caribbean. He later lived and taught in secondary schools in Venezuela, before coming to Britain in 1961.

His interest in culture – so-called serious music, literature and folk language and proverbs – preceded his commitment to politics and trade unionism. He saw these and cultural activity as interrelated in a vision of change. He wrote in his statement "About New Beacon Review" that his conception aimed "at the expression of the radical and the revolutionary. More easily definable in politics, and more complex and less easily definable, or indefinable, in the arts and culture". As an executive member of the Youth Council he produced their fortnightly radio programme Voice of Youth on Radio Trinidad; and in the mid-1950s, he co-authored with the calypsonian Raymond Quevedo – Atilla the Hun – the first serious study of the calypso, originally entitled Kaiso, A Review, subsequently published as Atilla's Kaiso (1983).

La Rose helped to form the Workers Freedom Movement (WFM) in the 1940s and was editor of the few published copies of their journal Freedom. He became an executive member of the Federated Workers Trade Union (later merged in the National Union of Government and Federated Workers), and later General Secretary of the West Indian Independence Party, which was formed out of the merger of the WFM with active trade unionists. He was later involved with the struggle within the Oilfields Workers' Trade Union (OWTU) by the "Rebels" for a radical, democratic and more representative trade unions, for one member one vote in regular periodical elections by secret ballot. The "Rebel" candidates won the elections in 1962 and he retained his close links with the OWTU and the international trade union movement, serving as the European representative of the OWTU from the 1960s until his death in 2006.

Life and work in Britain: 1961–2006

La Rose moved to Britain in 1961, making his home in London, while maintaining his close links with the Caribbean.

In August 1966, together with his partner Sarah White, he founded New Beacon Books, the first specialist Caribbean publishers, booksellers and international bookservice. Later in December 1966, he was co-founder with Edward Kamau Brathwaite and Andrew Salkey of the influential Caribbean Artists Movement (CAM). He was chairman of the Institute of Race Relations (IRR) in 1972/73, the period when the IRR was establishing its independence, and was also chairman of Towards Racial Justice, which was the vehicle for publishing the campaigning journal Race Today.

From the mid-1960s La Rose became closely involved in the Black Education Movement, including the fight against Banding, and against the wrongful placing of West Indian children in schools for the Educationally Sub-normal. In 1969, he founded the George Padmore Supplementary School, one of the first of its kind, and helped to found the Caribbean Education and Community Workers Association, which published Bernard Coard's How The West Indian Child Is Made Educationally Sub-normal in the British School System (1971). Later in the 1980s La Rose helped to found the National Association of Supplementary Schools and was its chairman for two years.

In 1966, he was a founder member of the Vietnam Solidarity Campaign and a national council member of this important anti-war movement.

He co-produced and scripted the documentary film The Mangrove Nine (1973), about the resistance to police attacks on the popular Mangrove restaurant in the early 1970s, with the film director Franco Rosso. La Rose produced a short film on the Black Church in Britain as part of a Full House BBC 2 television programme on the Caribbean arts in 1973.

In 1975 he co-founded the Black Parents Movement from the core of the parents involved in the George Padmore Supplementary School after an incident in which a young black schoolboy was beaten up by the police outside his school in the London Borough of Haringey.

The Black Parents Movement later formed an alliance with the Black Youth Movement and the Race Today Collective, which had, with the Race Today journal, by then separated from the IRR. Together they established a formidable cultural and political movement, successfully fighting many cases against police oppression and arbitrariness and for better state education. It was the Alliance that formed the New Cross Massacre Action Committee in response to the alleged arson attack which resulted in the death of 14 young blacks, and mobilised 20,000 black people and their supporters on 2 March 1981 – known as the Black People's Day of Action – to protest the death of the young people and the failure of the police to conduct a proper investigation. La Rose was Chairman of the New Cross Massacre Action Committee.

In 1982 he was instrumental in the founding of Africa Solidarity, in support of those struggling against dictatorial governments and tyranny in Africa. That year he also became Chairman of the Committee for the Release of Political Prisoners in Kenya, whose founding members included the Kenyan novelist and critic Ngũgĩ wa Thiong'o.

One of La Rose's greatest achievements was the International Book Fair of Radical Black and Third World Books (1982–95) organised originally jointly with Bogle-L'Ouverture Books and Race Today Publications. He was joint director with Bogle-L'Ouverture's Jessica Huntley of the Book Fair at its inception. After the withdrawal of Bogle-L'Ouverture from the organising committee, he became its sole director.

Held in the UK, at first in London and then also in other parts of the country, the Book Fairs and Book Fair Festivals brought together people from across the globe to participate in debates, forums, readings, musical events, films, plays and other cultural productions, as well as to browse through stalls from a multiplicity of publishers. They celebrated the enormous cultural and political achievements, addressed key issues of the times, and mirrored the achievements of black people throughout the world.

In response to concerns about the rise in fascism and xenophobia, La Rose helped to found European Action for Racial Equality and Social Justice in 1989, bringing together anti-racists and anti-fascists from Belgium, Italy, France and Germany.
 
La Rose was editor-in-chief of New Beacon Books until his death in 2006. He edited the occasional journal New Beacon Review (1968, 1985, 1986) and co-edited with Andrew Salkey the special issue of the magazine Savacou (Nos. 9/10, 1974) that provided a comprehensive anthology of black writing in Britain during the period of the Caribbean Artists Movement. La Rose published his first collection of poems, Foundations, in 1966 and his second collection, Eyelets of Truth Within Me, in 1992 (both published by New Beacon Books). His poems and essays have been widely anthologised, and his journalism was published regularly in Race Today. He co-authored Kaiso Calypso Music: David Rudder in Conversation with John La Rose in 1990.

In 1991 La Rose, together with a number of colleagues, founded the George Padmore Institute (GPI), a library, archive and educational research centre housing materials relating to the life experiences of Caribbean, African and Asian communities in Britain. The aims and objectives of the Institute are to organise: a library, educational resource and research centre, that will allow the materials in its care to be available for use by interested individuals and groups, both in person at the Institute and through the use of modern storage, retrieval and communication methods; educational and cultural activities, including conferences, courses, seminars, talks and readings; the publication of relevant materials. He was the Chairman of the George Padmore Institute from its inception until his death in 2006.

In introducing La Rose's talk on "The Politics of Culture: Writing and Publishing Today", which he organised as the Borough of Islington's Writer in Residence in London in May 1985, the novelist, playwright and critic Ngũgĩ wa Thiong'o wrote:

"John La Rose is immensely aware of the revolutionary potential of literature and culture in the world today. As a writer, publisher and cultural activist, he has helped in the growth of many writers in Africa, Caribbean, Europe and America. Rarely has anybody come into contact with him without being affected by his generous, searching, modern renaissance spirit."

Personal life 
La Rose married his first wife Irma La Rose (née Hilaire) in 1954. They had two sons, Michael and Keith.

La Rose had another son, Wole La Rose, with Sarah Swinburne White, his long-time partner and co-founder of New Beacon Books. 

Irma La Rose died in 2019. Sarah Swinburne White died in 2022.

Selected bibliography

Poetry
Foundations (1966), New Beacon Books
Eyelets of Truth Within Me (1992), New Beacon Books.

Journals
 New Beacon Review (1968, 1985, 1986) – editor

Essays
 

 Unending Journey: Selected Writings (Introduction by Linton Kwesi Johnson; 2014), New Beacon Books,

Obituaries and tributes
 
 
 
Busby, Margaret (November 2006). "Obituary: John La Rose", Wasafiri, Vol. 21, No. 3, pp. 65–67. DOI: 10.1080/02690050600918433.
 Hutchinson, Shaun, "A Black British Icon", The New Black Magazine.

Legacy
John La Rose is the subject of the 2003 documentary film Dream to Change the World — A Tribute to John La Rose, directed by Horace Ové and edited by Pete Stern.

The John La Rose Short Story Competition took place as part of the international conference "On Whose Terms? Critical Negotiations in Black British Literature and the Arts" organised by Goldsmiths College London in March 2008. Judged by R. Victoria Arana, Margaret Busby, Courttia Newland and Kadija Sesay, the competition was won by Molara Wood with her story "Written in Stone".

In 2011 BBC Radio 4 broadcast the programme What We Leave We Carry: The Legacy of John La Rose, presented by Burt Caesar, with contributions by Sarah White, Linton Kwesi Johnson, Margaret Busby, Susan Craig-Jones and Gus John.

The John La Rose Memorial Lectures comprised a series of three held since 2010, when the first lecture was given by David Abdulah, speaking on "Politics and People's Power after Obama". In 2011, Jayne Cortez spoke on "The Changing Nature of Black Cultural Politics", and Ngugi wa Thiong'o delivered the third lecture in 2013.

In 2013, La Rose was the posthumous recipient, together with Sarah White, of the Henry Swanzy Award for Distinguished Service to Caribbean Letters presented by the NGC Bocas Lit Fest as a "lifetime achievement award to recognise service to Caribbean literature by editors, publishers, critics, broadcasters, and others".

The exhibition Dream to Change the World: The Life & Legacy of John La Rose took place at Islington Museum from 22 May to 29 August 2015. A number of associated public events and workshops for schools were held during the course of the exhibition.

In December 2022, a decision was reached to change the name of Black Boy Lane in West Green, London, to "La Rose Lane", following two years of consultation by Haringey Council with local residents.

Further reading
 Roxy Harris and Sarah White, eds (1991), Foundations of a Movement: A Tribute to John La Rose. London: John La Rose Tribute Committee. .
 A Feschrift in honour of John La Rose on the occasion of the 10th Book Fair. With more than 60 celebratory tributes on his contribution to the struggle for social justice, cultural and social transformation from writers, artists, scholars and activists.
 Anne Walmsley (1992), The Caribbean Artists Movement: A Literary and Cultural History 1966–1972. London: New Beacon Books. .
 A history of the Caribbean Artists Movement (CAM) founded in London in 1966 by Edward Kamau Brathwaite, Andrew Salkey and John La Rose. The book provides a narrative account of the movement in its historical context. Among the many CAM members were C. L. R. James, Wilson Harris, Ronald Moody, Aubrey Williams, Orlando Patterson, Kenneth Ramchand, Gordon Rohlehr, Ivan van Sertima, Louis James, James Berry, Errol Lloyd and Doris Brathwaite.
 Brian W. Alleyne (2002), Radicals Against Race: Black Activism and Cultural Politics. New York: Berg. .
 A scholarly account of the story of New Beacon Books and the network of activist organisations that coalesced and developed around the bookshop and publishing house.
 Sarah White, Roxy Harris, Sharmilla Beezmohun, eds (2005), A Meeting of the Continents: The International Book Fair of Radical Black and Third World Books – Revisited. London: New Beacon Books. .
 A comprehensive account of the Book Fair with information on how it started, how it was organised, the role of La Rose, how and why it ended, memoirs from people all over the world who participated; plus the twelve brochures that accompanied each Book Fair and Book Fair Festival are reprinted in full.
 Kevin Meehan (2006), "Brilliant Episodes of Invention", in Wasafiri 21(3), November 2006, pp. 59–64.  (print),  (online) – critique of US poet Jayne Cortez's poetic tribute to La Rose in Foundations of a Movement (Harris and White, 1991).
 E. A. (Archie) Markham (2006), "Bookmarks for John La Rose", in At Home with Miss Vanesa, pp. 3–14 (a memoir of La Rose). Birmingham, UK: Tindal Street Press.

References

External links
 New Beacon Books
 George Padmore Institute
 "Personal Papers of John La Rose". George Padmore Institute.
 A 2003 documentary by Horace Ové about the life and work of John La Rose: Dream to Change the World -- A Tribute to John La Rose. YouTube.
 "John La Rose", Encyclopedia of Afroeuropean Studies.

Images
 Flickr photoset
 National Portrait Gallery

1927 births
2006 deaths
20th-century essayists
20th-century male writers
20th-century poets
Black British activists
Black British writers
British publishers (people)
Caribbean Artists Movement people
Male non-fiction writers
Male poets
People from Arima
Trinidad and Tobago activists
Trinidad and Tobago essayists
Trinidad and Tobago male writers
Trinidad and Tobago non-fiction writers
Trinidad and Tobago poets
Trinidad and Tobago trade unionists
British community activists